Rita Nemes (born 30 November 1989) is a Hungarian athlete who competes in the pentathlon. She finished in 6th place in the women's pentathlon at the 2021 European Athletics Indoor Championships.

References

Hungarian pentathletes
1989 births
Living people
Place of birth missing (living people)